Vulgar is a Latin word meaning "common" or "pertaining to ordinary people."

Language 

 Vulgar or common language, the vernacular speech of a region or a people
 Language use characterised by vulgarity, see Vulgarism and

Other uses 

A vulgar fraction in mathematics, one written in the common way and not as a decimal fraction
Vulgar (film), a 2000 American film
 Vulgar (album), a 2003 album by Japanese band Dir en grey

See also

 Vulgate (disambiguation)
 Vulgaris (disambiguation)
 Vulgaria, a 2012 film
 Volgar (disambiguation)
 Bulgar (disambiguation)
 Bolgar (disambiguation)